Associação Esportiva Tiradentes, commonly known as Tiradentes, is a Brazilian football club based in Fortaleza, Ceará state. They competed in the Série C once.

History
The club was founded on 15 September 1961. They won the Campeonato Cearense in 1992.

Achievements
 Campeonato Cearense:
 Winners (1): 1992

Stadium

Associação Esportiva Tiradentes play their home games at Estádio Presidente Vargas. The stadium has a maximum capacity of 23,000 people. The club also plays at Estádio Alcides Santos, which has a maximum capacity of 7,100 people.

References

Association football clubs established in 1961
Football clubs in Ceará
1961 establishments in Brazil